Hungary competed at the 1988 Summer Paralympics in Seoul, South Korea. 34 competitors from Hungary won 12 medals including 4 silver and 8 bronze and finished 40th in the medal table.

See also 
 Hungary at the Paralympics
 Hungary at the 1988 Summer Olympics

References 

Hungary at the Paralympics
1988 in Hungarian sport
Nations at the 1988 Summer Paralympics